The Stadio Aragona is a football stadium in Vasto, Italy. It is the home stadium of F.C. Pro Vasto. 

Aragona